The Indian state of Arunachal Pradesh currently has two operational airports and one proposed airport at the state capital Itanagar. The state also has a number of military airbases and airstrips that are used by the Indian Air Force. The state of Arunachal Pradesh received its first flight in the year 2018 when Alliance Air's first flight landed at Pasighat Airport from Guwahati. The second airport to get operationalised was Tezu Airport. 

The proposed Itanagar Airport at Itanagar will be inaugurated in October 2022 for commercial operations. There are plans to develop an airport at Tawang to increase tourism and increase security. Upgradation of existing airstrips under the Government of India's UDAN scheme is also proposed to increase tourism in Arunachal Pradesh and develop the state.

List
The list includes the airports in the Indian state of Arunachal Pradesh with their respective ICAO and IATA codes.

References

Arunachal Pradesh
Buildings and structures in Arunachal Pradesh